Michael Hovhannisyan (March 1, 1867 – July 13, 1933), known by the pen name Nar-Dos, was an Armenian writer.

Biography 

Nar-Dos was born to a wool seller's family in Tbilisi, Georgia in 1867. He started his education in a parochial school of Saint Karapet Church, and he continued it in Nicolaev Municipal School. He later entered Khon Seminary, Kutaisi, which he did not finish because of scarcity of living, and returned to Tbilisi. He was engaged in the profession of a locksmith at Michaelian craft school where he met Armenian poet Alexander Tsaturyan.

A year later Nar-Dos left Michaelyan craft school and started practicing journalism. In 1890–1906 he was the responsible secretary of the periodical Nor dar ("A New Century"). He worked as a secretary and proofreader at the journal Aghbyur-Taraz ("Source of Fashion")  in 1903, and in the newspaper Surhandak ("Courier")  from 1913–1918.

Nar-Dos began writing in the 1880s starting with poems, some of which were published in Araks in Saint-Petersburg, Russia, and "Sokhak Hayastani" ("The Nightingale of Armenia" ) poetry collections. He also wrote stories, satirical articles and plays. Under the influence of Gabriel Sundukian, Nar-Dos created the plays "Mayin's Complaint" ("Մայինի գանգատը"), “Honey and flies” («Մեղր և ճանճեր») (1886),  and “Brother” («Եղբայր») (1887).

Under the pen name of Mikho-Ohan he published “Tchshmarit barekamy” («Ճշմարիտ բարեկամը»), “Nune” («Նունե»)(1886), («Բարերար և որդեգիր») (1888),  
“Knkush larer” («Քնքուշ լարեր») (1887),  and “Zazunyan” («Զազունյան») (1890)  in the newspaper Nor dar. 

In the stories and novels of his first period he mainly describes the urban life focusing on certain social groups (“Our District” («Մեր թաղը»), "Hopop" (1890), "Hogun vra hasav" ("Հոգուն վրա հասավ") (1889), "Anna Saroyan" ("Աննա Սարոյան") (1888)). One of the famous stories of this period is “Me and Him” («Ես և նա»), written in 1889.

After 1890 a new period began in Nar-Dos' creative life, in which deep psychological analysis was typical. Famous works of this period are “The Killed Dove” («Սպանված աղավնին») (1898), in which the author depicts the tragedy of an Armenian woman,
“Struggle” («Պայքար») (1911),     and “The Death” («Մահը») (reedited in 1912).

Nar-Dos developed the psychological trend of Armenian critical realism displaying refined Armenian language.

Nar-Dos died in 1933 in Tbilisi. He is buried in Khojivank Armenian cemetery.

References

External links
 «Սպանված աղավնի» (in Armenian)
 «Անհետ կորածը» (in Armenian)
 «Ազատամտության դրոշակակիրը» (in Armenian)
 «Եղբայր» (in Armenian)
 «Հենակներով մարդը» (in Armenian)
 «Քնքուշ լարեր» (in Armenian)
 «Մահը» (in Armenian)
 «Մեղր և ճանճեր» (in Armenian)
 «Նեղ օրերից մեկը» (in Armenian)
 «Նոր մարդը» (in Armenian)
 «Պայքար» (in Armenian)
 «Մեր թաղը, զանազան պատմվածքներ, վիպակներ, հեքիաթներ» (in Armenian)
 «Զազունյան» (in Armenian)
 «Ես և նա» (in Armenian)
 Nar-Dos biography in Russian

1867 births
1933 deaths
20th-century Armenian writers
Writers from Tbilisi
People from Tiflis Governorate
Georgian people of Armenian descent
Armenian male writers
Soviet Armenians
Burials at Armenian Pantheon of Tbilisi
19th-century Armenian writers